William Becker may refer to:

William D. Becker (1876–1943), American politician and 39th mayor of St. Louis, Missouri
William J. Becker (1927–2015), American theater critic and film studio executive (Janus Films)
William W. Becker (1921–2007), American creator of the Motel 6 concept
William H. Becker (1909–1992), U.S. federal judge

See also
Wilhelm Adolf Becker (1796–1846), German archaeologist